Uncial 0263 (in the Gregory-Aland numbering), is a Greek uncial manuscript of the New Testament. Paleographically, it has been assigned to the 6th century.

Description 

The codex contains small part of the Gospel of Mark 5:26-27,31, on one parchment leaf (28 cm by 22 cm). It is survived in a fragmentary condition. Written in one column per page, 17 lines per page, in uncial letters.

Currently, it is dated by the INTF to the 6th century.

Location 

Currently, the codex is housed at the Berlin State Museums (P. 14045) in Berlin.

Text 
The text-type of this codex is unknown, as the text is too brief to determine its textual character. Aland did not place it in any of Categories of New Testament manuscripts.

See also 

 List of New Testament uncials
 Textual criticism

References

Further reading 

 Kurt Treu, "Neue Neutestamentliche Fragmente der Berliner Papyrussammlung", APF 18 (Berlin: 1966), pp. 23-38. 
 G. H. R. Horsley, "New Documents Illustrating Early Christianity" 2 (Macquarie University, 1982), pp. 125-140. 

Greek New Testament uncials
6th-century biblical manuscripts